Erdely may refer to:

 Erdély, Hungarian name for Transylvania
 Sabrina Erdely (born 1971/1972), American magazine reporter known for the defamatory Rolling Stone article "A Rape on Campus"